Candy Pop may refer to:

 Female punk-inspired pop music.
 "Candy Pop", a song by Heartsdales featuring Soul'd Out
 "Candy Pop", a song by Len
 "Candy Pop" (Twice song)
 Candy Pop, a 2018 Twice concert tour